Mörrumsån is a river in Blekinge County and Kronoberg County, Sweden. The river is known among fishing enthusiasts around the world, because of the salmon fishing that is considered to be among the best in Sweden. The most prominent villages where the river flows through are Mörrum and Svängsta, both located in Karlshamn Municipality.

References

External links

 Sportfiskeguide.se

Rivers of Kronoberg County
 
Rivers of Blekinge County
Ramsar sites in Sweden